Orasema is a genus of chalcid wasps in the family Eucharitidae. There are at least 50 described species in Orasema.

Species
These 53 species belong to the genus Orasema:

 Orasema aenea Gahan, 1940 c g
 Orasema argentina Gemignani, 1933 c g
 Orasema assectator Kerrich, 1963 c g
 Orasema aureoviridis Gahan, 1940 c g
 Orasema bakeri Gahan, 1940 c g
 Orasema beameri Gahan, 1940 c g
 Orasema bouceki Heraty, 1994 c g
 Orasema cameroni Howard, 1897 c g
 Orasema cockerelli Gahan, 1940 c g
 Orasema coloradensis Wheeler, 1907 c g
 Orasema communis Risbec, 1952 c g
 Orasema costaricensis Wheeler & Wheeler, 1937 c g
 Orasema delhiensis Narendran & Girish Kumar, 2005 c g
 Orasema delicatula (Walker, 1862) c g
 Orasema deltae Gemignani, 1937 c g
 Orasema festiva (Fabricius, 1804) c g
 Orasema fraudulenta (Reichensperger, 1913) c g
 Orasema gemignanii De Santis, 1967 c g
 Orasema glabra Heraty, 1994 c g
 Orasema initiator Kerrich, 1963 c g
 Orasema ishii Heraty, 1994 c g
 Orasema koghisiana Heraty, 1994 c g
 Orasema minuta Ashmead, 1888 c g
 Orasema minutissima Howard, 1894 c g
 Orasema monomoria Heraty, 2000 c g
 Orasema neomexicana Gahan, 1940 c g
 Orasema nigra Heraty, 1994 c g
 Orasema occidentalis Ashmead, 1892 c g b
 Orasema pireta Heraty, 1993 c g
 Orasema promecea Heraty, 1994 c g
 Orasema rapo (Walker, 1839) c g
 Orasema robertsoni Gahan, 1940 c g
 Orasema rugulosa Heraty, 1994 c g
 Orasema salebrosa Heraty, 1993 c g
 Orasema seyrigi Risbec, 1952 c g
 Orasema simplex Heraty, 1993 c g
 Orasema simulatrix Gahan, 1940 c g
 Orasema sixaolae Wheeler & Wheeler, 1937 c g
 Orasema smithi Howard, 1897 c g
 Orasema stramineipes Cameron, 1884 c g
 Orasema striatosoma Heraty, 1994 c g
 Orasema susanae Gemignani, 1947 c g
 Orasema synempora Heraty, 1994 c g
 Orasema texana Gahan, 1940 c g
 Orasema tolteca Mann, 1914 c g
 Orasema uichancoi (Ishii, 1932) c g
 Orasema valgius (Walker, 1839) c g
 Orasema vianai Gemignani, 1937 c g
 Orasema violacea Ashmead, 1888 c g
 Orasema viridis Ashmead, 1895 c g
 Orasema wheeleri Wheeler, 1907 c g
 Orasema worcesteri (Girault, 1913) c g
 Orasema xanthopus (Cameron, 1909) c g

Data sources: i = ITIS, c = Catalogue of Life, g = GBIF, b = Bugguide.net

References

Further reading

External links

 

Parasitic wasps
Chalcidoidea